A list of windmills in the Belgian province of West Flanders.

Notes
Bold indicates a mill that is still standing. Italics indicates a mill with some remains surviving.

External links

Buildings and structures in West Flanders
Tourist attractions in West Flanders
West Flanders